Alexandru Starîș is a Moldovan footballer who plays as a defender.

Notes

References

External links

Alexandru Starîș at Zimbru website

1995 births
Living people
Moldovan footballers
Moldova youth international footballers
Moldova under-21 international footballers
Association football defenders
Moldovan Super Liga players
FC Zimbru Chișinău players
Speranța Nisporeni players
Liga II players
FC Metaloglobus București players
Moldovan expatriate footballers
Moldovan expatriate sportspeople in Romania
Expatriate footballers in Romania